Elda Aída Pértile (born 3 June 1953) is an Argentine politician. Pértile has been active in politics since the 1980s; as a member of the local Acción Chaqueña party, she was elected intendenta (mayor) of Resistencia, Chaco in 1991, serving until 1995. She was also a member of the Resistencia City Council, and served in the Chamber of Deputies of Chaco during two consecutive terms from 2009 to 2017. From 2017 to 2021, she served as a National Deputy.

Pértile was elected to the Argentine Chamber of Deputies in 2017 for the Chaco Merece Más Front, and later sat in the Frente de Todos bloc.

Early life and education
Pértile was born on 3 June 1953 in Resistencia, Chaco Province. She studied public accounting at the National University of the Northeast (UNNE), graduating in 1975. She has also taught administration sciences at the UNNE.

Pértile's husband died in 2017. She has two sons, Esteban and Santiago.

Political career
Pértile's political career began in Acción Chaqueña, a conservative provincial party founded by Resistencia mayor José Ruiz Palacios in 1988. In 1989, Pértile was elected to the Resistencia City Council. Two years later, she was elected mayor of Resistencia herself. She was re-elected for a second two-year term in 1993.

In 1999, Pértile ran for vice-governor of Chaco in the Justicialist Party ticket, headed by Jorge Capitanich. The Capitanich–Pértile ticket received 35.90% of the vote, coming up second in the general election against the Radical Civic Union's Ángel Rozas. From 2002 to 2007, she was a technical advisor at the Federal Tax Redistribution Commission of the National Senate. In 2007, she was appointed General Secretary of Government of Chaco by Governor Capitanich.

In 2009, Pértile was elected to the Provincial Chamber of Deputies of Chaco, as part of the Chaco Merece Más Front (allied to the Front for Victory). She was re-elected in 2013.

National Deputy
Ahead of the 2017 legislative election, Pértile was nominated as the first candidate in the Chaco Merece Más list to the Argentine Chamber of Deputies, followed by Juan Mosqueda. The list was the second-most voted in the province, with 39.61% of the vote, and both Pértile and Mosqueda were elected. Pértile and Mosqueda formed part of the dissident "Argentina Federal" parliamentary bloc, separate from the Front for Victory bloc led by Agustín Rossi.

As deputy, Pértile formed part of the parliamentary commissions on Municipal Affairs, Population and Human Development, Budget and Treasury, Economy, and Internal Security. She was an opponent of the legalization of abortion in Argentina, voting against the two Voluntary Interruption of Pregnancy bills that passed the Chamber, in 2018 and 2020.

References

External links

Profile on the official website of the Chamber of Deputies (in Spanish)

Living people
1953 births
People from Resistencia, Chaco
Members of the Argentine Chamber of Deputies elected in Chaco
Women members of the Argentine Chamber of Deputies
Members of the Chamber of Deputies of Chaco Province
Mayors of Resistencia, Chaco
Women mayors of places in Argentina
National University of the Northeast alumni
Justicialist Party politicians
20th-century Argentine politicians
21st-century Argentine politicians
21st-century Argentine women politicians